This is a list of the first women lawyer(s) and judge(s) in Texas. It includes the year in which the women were admitted to practice law (in parentheses). Also included are women who achieved other distinctions such becoming the first in their state to graduate from law school or become a political figure.

Firsts in state history

Law School 

 Hattie Ruth Elam Briscoe: First African American female to graduate from law school in Texas (1956)

Lawyers 

Edith W. Locke (1902): First female admitted to practice law in Texas, though she did not exercise the right 
Hortense Sparks Ward (1910): First female lawyer in Texas, as well as the first female admitted to practice law before the U.S. Supreme Court (1915) 
Florence Bates (1914): One of the first female lawyers in Texas. She would leave the profession and become a Hollywood actress later in life.
Beverly Tarpley (1952): First female lawyer in Texas to argue a case before the U.S. Supreme Court
Charlye O. Farris (1953): First African American female lawyer in Texas
Edna Cisneros (1955): First Hispanic American female lawyer in Texas

Judicial Officers

State

Judges 

Sarah T. Hughes (1922): First female judge in Texas (1935)
Charlye O. Farris (1953): First African American female to serve as a judge pro tem in Texas (1954)
Harriet Mitchell Murphy (1969): First African American female judge in Texas (1973)
Wendy Duong: First Vietnamese American (female) judge in Texas (1992)
Barbara Hartle: First openly LGBT female judge in Texas (2006)
Phyllis Frye (1981): First openly LGBT judge in Texas (2010)
Tonya Parker: First openly LGBT African American (female) elected to a judicial seat in Texas (2010)
Rabeea Sultan Collier: First Muslim American and Pakistani American (female) judge in Texas (2019)
Manpreet Monica Singh: First Sikh female judge in Texas (2023)

County Court 

 Mary Velma Davenport: First female county judge in Texas (c. 1938)
Charlye O. Farris (1953): First African American female elected as a county judge pro tem in Texas (1954)
Alicia Chacón: First Latino American female elected as a judge of a major county in Texas (c. 1990s)

Municipal Court 

 Barbara Hartle: First openly LGBT female to become a municipal court judge in Texas (2006)
 Elia Cornejo Lopez First Female to be appointed Municipal court Judge in Brownsville Texas (2008)
Phyllis Frye (1981): First openly LGBT individual appointed as a municipal court judge in Texas (2010)

District Court 

 Sarah T. Hughes (1922): First female appointed as a Judge of the District Court in Texas (1935)
Elma Salinas Ender (1978): First Latino American female to serve as a state district court judge in Texas (1983)
Mary Roman: First Latino American female elected as a state district court judge in Texas (1992)
 Kristen Hawkins (2000): First female elected as a Judge of the Eleventh District Court in Texas (2017)
 Renee Rodriguez-Betancourt: First female to become the youngest district court judge in Texas (2017)

Court of Appeals 

Shirley W. Butts (1954): First female appointed as Justice of the Fourth Court of Appeals in Texas (1981)
Camille Hutson–Dunn (1963): First female appointed as a Justice of the First Court of Appeals in Texas (1984)
Alice Oliver–Parrott: First female to serve as a Chief Justice in the Texas Court of Appeals (1991-1996)
Gaynelle Griffin Jones: First African American female to serve as an appellate court judge in Texas (1992)
 Linda Reyna Yanez: First female to serve as a Justice of the Thirteenth Court of Appeals in Texas (1993)
 Dori Contreras: First female justice appointed as the Chief Justice of the Thirteenth Court of Appeals in Texas (2019)
Frances Bourliot: First Asian American female elected as an appellate court judge in Texas (2020)
Robbie Partida-Kipness: First Hispanic American (female) to serve as a Judge of the Fifth Court of Appeals in Texas (2018)
Yvonne T. Rodriguez: First Latino American female to serve as the Chief Justice of the Eighth Court of Appeals (2021)

Criminal Court of Appeals 

 Sharon Keller (1978): First female to serve as the Presiding Judge of the Texas Criminal Court of Appeals (2000)
 Elsa Alcala: First Latino American female to serve as a Judge of the Texas Criminal Court of Appeals (2011)

Supreme Court 

Margaret Harris Amsler (1937): First female to serve as the Marshall of the Supreme Court of Texas (1941)
Ruby Kless Sondock (1961): First female appointed as a Justice of the Supreme Court of Texas (1982)
Rose Spector: First female (who was also Jewish) elected as a Justice of the Supreme Court of Texas (1992)
Eva Guzman: First Hispanic female appointed as a Justice of the Supreme Court of Texas (2009)

Federal

District Court 

Sarah T. Hughes (1922): First female appointed as a Judge of the Federal District Court (1961) in Texas
Barbara M.G. Lynn (1976): First female to become the Chief Judge of the U.S. District Court for the Northern District of Texas (2016)
Gabrielle Kirk McDonald: First African American female appointed as a Judge of the Southern District of Texas (1979)
Hilda G. Tagle: First Hispanic American female to serve as an appellate judge in Texas
Alia Moses (1986): First female as a Judge of the U.S. States District Court for the Western District of Texas (2002) and its Chief Judge (2022)
Brenda T. Rhoades: First Asian American (female) to serve as a Judge of the U.S. Bankruptcy Court for the Eastern District of Texas (2003)
Judith K. Guthrie:  First female appointed as a Magistrate Judge of the U.S. States District Court for the Eastern District of Texas
Karen Gren Scholer: First Asian American (female) U.S. district court judge in Texas (2018)
Ada E. Brown: First African American and Native American female to serve as a Judge of the United States District Court for the Northern District of Texas (2019)

Court of Appeals 

 Carolyn Dineen King: First female to serve as the Chief Judge of the United States Court of Appeals for the Fifth Circuit (1999)
 Leanne Johnson: First female elected to serve as a Justice of the Ninth Circuit Court of Appeals for Texas (2014)

Deputy Attorney General 

 Elizabeth B. Lacy: First female to serve as the Deputy Attorney General for Texas (1973)

Assistant Attorney General 

 Ethel F. Hilton: First female to serve as the Assistant Attorney General for Texas (1927-1931)

District Attorney 

 Bonnie Leggat Hagan: First female to become a District Attorney in Texas
Edna Cisneros (1955): First Hispanic American female to become a District Attorney in Texas

Assistant District Attorney 

 Sarah Menezes: First female to serve as the Assistant District Attorney in Texas

United States Attorney 

 Gaynelle Griffin Jones: First female (and African American female) to serve as a U.S. Attorney for Texas (1993-1997)
 Sarah Saldaña: First Latino American female to serve as the U.S. Attorney for the Northern District of Texas (2011)

County Attorney 

 Nellie Gray Robertson: First female to serve as a County Attorney in Texas (1918)

Political Office 

 Barbara Jordan (1959): First African American female lawyer elected to the Texas Senate (1966)
 Irma L. Rangel (1969): First Hispanic American female elected to the Texas State Legislature (1976)
 Sylvia Garcia (1978) and Veronica Escobar: First Hispanic American females (both former judges) elected to Congress in Texas (2018)
Nandita Berry (1995): First Indian American female (and Indian American in general; a lawyer) to serve as the Secretary of State for Texas (c. 2014)
Jolanda Jones (1995): First openly lesbian African American (a lawyer) elected to the Texas State Legislature (upon winning a special election in House District 147 in 2022)

Bar Association 

 Harriet Miers (1970): First female to serve as President of the State Bar of Texas (1992)
Lisa Tatum: First African American female (and African American in general) to serve as the President of the State Bar of Texas (2013-2014)
Sylvia Borunda Firth: First Hispanic American female to serve as the President of the State Bar of Texas (2020)

Firsts in local history
Alphabetized by county name

Regions 

 Leticia Hinojosa: First female judge in the Rio Grande Valley, Texas (1996)
Ginger D. Fagan: First female county judge elected in South Texas (upon becoming a judge in Refugio County in 1978)
Erum Jivani-Gillani: First Asian American female to serve as a Judge of the Pearland Municipal Court (2018) [Brazoria, Fort Bend and Harris Counties, Texas]
Angela Saucier: First female to serve as a Judge of the 76th Judicial District (2019) [Camp, Morris and Titus Counties, Texas]
Hortense Sparks Ward (1910): First female lawyer in Houston, Texas [Fort Bend County, Harris County and Montgomery County]
Lois L. Woods: First African American female graduate from the Texas Southern University Thurgood Marshall School of Law (1951) [Fort Bend, Harris, and Montgomery Counties, Texas]
Lynne Liberato: First female to serve as the President of the Houston Bar Association (1993) [Fort Bend County, Harris County and Montgomery County]
Kristen Brauchle Hawkins: First female appointed as a Judge of the Eleventh District Court in Houston, Texas (2019) [Fort Bend County, Harris County and Montgomery County]
Irene Gertrude Brown (1911) and Rose Zelosky: First females to graduate from the University of Texas law school (1914) [Hays, Travis and Williamson Counties, Texas]
Beverly Tarpley (1952): First female to serve as the President of the Abilene Bar Association [Jones and Taylor Counties, Texas]

Anderson County 

 Allyson Mitchell: First female District Attorney for Anderson County, Texas (2015)

Andrews County 

 Jeneane Anderegg: First female to serve as Commissioner for the Commissioners' Court of Andrews County, Texas (2014)

Aransas County 

 Lola L. Bonner: First female to serve as the President of the Aransas County Bar Association, Texas

Austin County 

 Carolyn Bilski: First female to serve as the County Judge of Austin County, Texas

Bastrop County 

 Emma Webb (1923): First female lawyer in Bastrop County, Texas

Bee County 

 Stephanie Moreno: First female county judge in Bee County, Texas

Bell County 

 Martha Trudo: First female judge in Bell County, Texas
Ebony Todd: First African American female to serve as a municipal court judge in Nolanville, Texas (2020) [Bell County, Texas]

Bexar County 
 Judge Antonia “Toni” Arteaga - 1st woman to be elected to the historic 57th District Court which was created in 1899.

 Irene Gertrude Brown (1911): First female lawyer in San Antonio, Texas [Bexar County, Texas]
Lanette Heilbron Glasscock (1931): One of the first practicing female lawyers in Bexar County, Texas
Mary Agnes Aird: First female law graduate of St. Mary's University (1936) [Bexar County, Texas]
Elizabeth Carrie Jandt: First female law graduate of St. Mary's University who was the daughter of an alumnus [Bexar County, Texas]
Hattie Ruth Elam Briscoe: First African American female lawyer in Bexar County, Texas (c. 1956)
Carol Haberman Knight-Sheen: First female district court judge in Bexar County, Texas
Janice S. McCoy: First female to serve as a Judge of the San Antonio Municipal Court (1977) [Bexar County, Texas]
Sparta Christ Bitsis: First female lawyer to work for San Antonio’s Corporation Court
Mary Roman: First Latino American female elected as a state district court judge in Bexar County, Texas (1992)
Susan Reed: First female to serve as the District Attorney for Bexar County, Texas (1998)
Jane Macon: First female to serve as the City Attorney for San Antonio, Texas (1977-1983) [Bexar County, Texas]
Rosie Speedlin Gonzalez: First openly LGBT (female) judge in Bexar County, Texas (2019)
Kimberly Burley: First female and African American to preside in the Bexar County Children’s Court (2021)

Bowie County 

 Kelley Crisp: First female to serve as the Assistant District Attorney for Bowie County, Texas (2019)

Brazoria County 

Jerri Lee Mills: First female judge in Brazoria County, Texas (1995)

Brewster County 

 Val Beard: First female county judge in Brewster County, Texas

Brooks County 

 Imelda Barrera: First female county judge in Brooks County, Texas

Burnet County 

 Ophelia "Birdie" Harwood: First female judge in Marble Falls, Texas (1936) [Burnet County, Texas]
Donna Klaeger: First female judge in Burnet County, Texas

Caldwell County 

 Rebecca Hawener: First female county judge in Caldwell County, Texas

Cameron County 

 Migdalia Lopez: First female elected as a County Court at Law Judge in Cameron County, Texas. She is the first female to serve as a District Court Judge in Cameron and Willacy Counties, Texas.

Camp County 

 Angela Saucier: First female to serve as a Judge of the 76th Judicial District (2019) [Camp, Morris and Titus Counties, Texas]

Cass County 

 Courtney Shelton: First female District Attorney for Cass County, Texas (2018)

Chambers County 

 Alma Lois Turner: First female county judge in Chambers County, Texas (1978-1986)

Comal County 

 Jennifer Tharp: First female District Attorney for Comal County, Texas (2011)
Sue Funk: First female municipal court judge in New Braunfels, Texas

Dallas County 

Louise Raggio (c. 1939): First female prosecutor in Dallas County, Texas
 Lillian Brock: First female lawyer in Dallas, Texas [Dallas County, Texas]
 Adelfa B. Callejo: (1961) First Hispanic American female lawyer in Dallas, Texas [Dallas County, Texas]
Harriet Miers (1970): First female to serve as President of the Dallas Bar Association, Texas (1986)
Laura Benitez Geisler: First Hispanic American female (and Hispanic American in general) to serve as the President of the Dallas Bar Association, Texas (2018)
 Joan Winn: First African American female judge in Dallas, Texas (1975) [Dallas County, Texas]
Margaret Keliher: First female to serve as the Dallas County Judge, Texas (2002-2006)
Susan Hawk: First female District Attorney for Dallas County, Texas (2015-2016)
Faith Johnson: First African American female District Attorney for Dallas County, Texas (2016)
Audrey Moorehead: First female (and African American female) elected as the Judge of Dallas County Criminal Court #3 in Texas (2018)

Delta County 

 Ginny Phifer: First female Justice of the Peace in Delta County, Texas

Denton County 

 Mary Horn: First female county judge in Denton County, Texas

Ector County 

 Sara Kate Billingsley: First female district judge in Ector County, Texas (2015)

El Paso County 

 Edith Shirley Abbott: First female lawyer in El Paso, Texas [El Paso County, Texas]
 Edelmira Navarro: Reputed to be the first Latino American female lawyer in El Paso, Texas [El Paso County, Texas]
 Kitty Schild (1972) and Janet Reusch: First female judges in El Paso, Texas [El Paso County, Texas]
 Maxine Shaprow (1979): First African American female Assistant District Attorney for El Paso, Texas [El Paso County, Texas]

Ellis County 

 Barbara Warren: First female (and African American) judge in Waxahachie, Texas [Ellis County, Texas]

Erath County 

 Lanelle Harbin: First female judge in Erath County, Texas (1961)

Falls County 

 Nita Wuebker: First female to serve on the Falls County Commissioners Court (2015)

Fannin County 

 Mildred Eileen Cox: First female county judge in Fannin County, Texas

Fort Bend County 

Kathleen Lindsey: First female lawyer in Fort Bend County, Texas
 Toni Wallace: First African American female judge in Fort Bend County, Texas (2016)
Juli Mathew: First Judge of Asian descent to be elected to the Bench in Fort Bend County, Texas (2018) First Indian American women elected to the bench in the United States.
Jennifer C. Chiang:  First Asian American appointed to serve on the Bench in Fort Bend County, First Asian American Judge to serve on the Sugar Land Municipal Court (2015)

Galveston County 

 Susan P. Baker: First female judge in Galveston County, Texas (1991)

Gray County 

 Rosa Jane White: First female lawyer to try a case in Pampa, Texas [Gray County, Texas]

Gregg County 

 Olga Lapin: First female lawyer in Gregg County, Texas

Grimes County 

 Andria Bender: First female District Attorney for Grimes County, Texas (2017)

Guadalupe County 

 Elizabeth Carrie Jandt: First female lawyer in Guadalupe County, Texas. She was also the first female elected as the County Attorney.

Harris County 

 Gloria K. Bradford: First African American female to try a case in the Harris County District Court
 Hannah Chow: First Asian American female (and Asian American in general) to serve as a Judge of the Harris County Criminal Court at Law No. 5 (1987)
 Phyllis Frye (1981): First openly LGBT individual to serve as a Judge of the Houston Municipal Court in Texas (2010)
 Jo Ann Delgado: First Latino American female elected as a Justice of the Peace, Precinct 2, Place 1 of Harris County, Texas (2001)
 Pat Lykos: First female District Attorney for Harris County, Texas (2009)
 Debra Ibarra Mayfield: First Latino American female to serve as a county court judge in Harris County, Texas (2011)
 Lina Hidalgo: First female (and Hispanic woman of Colombian descent) elected as the Harris County Judge (2018)
 Shannon Baldwin: First openly LGBT African American female judge in Harris County, Texas (2018)
 Joyce M. Burg (1926): First female lawyer in Houston, Texas [Harris County, Texas]
 Barbara Hartle: First openly LGBT female to serve as a Judge of the Houston Municipal Court in Texas (2006)
 Sherry D. Tavel: First female municipal judge in Pasadena, Texas [Harris County, Texas]

Hidalgo County 

Micaela Alvarez (1989): First female (and Hispanic woman) appointed as a Judge of the 139th Judicial District Court in Hidalgo County, Texas (1995). She would later become a district court judge.
Renee Rodriguez-Betancourt: First female to become the youngest district court judge in Hidalgo County, Texas (2017)

Hood County 

Nellie Gray Robertson: First female to serve as the Hood County Attorney (1918)
Linda Steen: First female county judge in Hood County, Texas (1999)

Hudspeth County 

 Becky Dean: First female judge in Hudspeth County, Texas

Hunt County 

 Keli Aiken: First female elected to serve as a district court judge in Hunt County, Texas

Jefferson County 

 Lindsey Scott: First female to become a state district judge in Jefferson County, Texas (2014)

Karnes County 

 Barbara Shaw: First female county judge in Karnes County, Texas (c. 2010)
Audrey Gossett-Louis: First female to serve as the District Attorney for the 281st Judicial District [Karnes County, Texas]

Kaufman County 

 Maxine Darst Flatt (1976): First female lawyer in Kaufman County, Texas. She would later become a judge.

Liberty County 

 Lois Marie Jett: First female to earn a law degree in Liberty County, Texas
 Peggy Dunn: First female elected judge in Liberty County, Texas (2007)

Llano County 

 Mary S. Cunningham: First female judge in Llano County, Texas (2014)

Lubbock County 

Emma K. Boone (1918): First female lawyer in Lubbock County, Texas
 Pat Moore (1949): First female lawyer elected to public office in Lubbock County, Texas (upon becoming a Judge of Lubbock County Court at Law, Number 2 in Lubbock, Texas; 1957). She is also the first female appointed as a Judge of the 72nd District Court.
 Aurora Chaides Hernandez (1995): First Hispanic American female to serve as Precinct 3 Justice of the Peace (1994) in Lubbock, Texas [Lubbock County, Texas]

McLennan County 

 Margaret Harris Amsler (1937): First female to graduate from Baylor Law School [McLennan County, Texas]

Medina County 

 Francis C. Richter (1938): First female lawyer in Medina County, Texas

Midland County 

 Barbara Culver: First female judge in Midland County, Texas (1962)
Teresa Clingman: First female District Attorney for Midland County, Texas

Montague County 

 Stacy Gamblin: First female to serve as a Commissioner in Montague County, Texas

Montgomery County 

Barbara Hale (1982): First female to become the Assistant County Attorney for Montgomery County, Texas (1982-1989)

Morris County 

Lynda Munkres: First female judge in Morris County, Texas (2011)

Nacogdoches County 

 Sue Kennedy: First female judge in Nacogdoches County, Texas

Newton County 

 Leona Jones Choate: First female Justice of the Peace in Newton County, Texas (1974)

Nueces County 

Rene Haas: First female judge in Nueces County, Texas (1982)
 Hilda G. Tagle: First Hispanic American female judge in Nueces County, Texas (1985)
 Nanette Hasette: First Hispanic American female to serve as a district court judge in Nueces County, Texas
Barbara Canales: First female (and Hispanic American female) elected as a judge in Nueces County, Texas (2019)
Irma L. Rangel (1969): First female (and Hispanic American) to serve as the Assistant District Attorney for Corpus Christi, Texas [Nueces County, Texas]

Orange County 

 Courtney Arkeen: First female state district judge in Orange County, Texas (2011)

Panola County 

 Lee Ann Jones: First female county judge in Panola County, Texas (2014)

Potter County 

 Nancy Tanner: First female judge in Potter County, Texas
 Nancy "N.S." Garms: First female to serve as the President of the Amarillo Bar Association

Presidio County 

 Cinderela Guevara: First female county judge in Presidio County, Texas

Real County 

 Bella Rubio: First female county judge in Real County, Texas (2018)

Rockwall County 

 Lorie Grinnan: First female to be re-elected as a Commissioner for Rockwall County, Texas

San Patricio County 

 Tamara Cochran-May: First female to serve as the County Attorney for San Patricio County, Texas (2016)

Shackelford County 

 Joanne Fincher: First female judge in Shackelford County, Texas (1977)

Shelby County 

 Allison Harbison: First female judge in Shelby County, Texas (c. 2015)

Smith County 

 Ruth Blake (1966): First female judge in Smith County, Texas
Ruth Yeager:  First female to serve as the President of the Smith County Bar Association, Texas

Tarrant County 

 Shirley W. Butts (1954): First female Assistant District Attorney in Tarrant County, Texas
Brooke Allen: First female probate court judge in Tarrant County, Texas
Dionne Phillips Bagsby: First African American female elected to the Tarrant County Commissioners Court (1988)
Sharen Wilson: First female District Attorney for Tarrant County, Texas (c. 2017)
Eva Barnes, nee Bloore, (1963) First female District Judge in Tarrant County, Domestic Relations Court No. 1, which later became the 322nd District Court in 1977.

Tom Green County 

 Marilyn Aboussie (1974): First female district judge in Tom Green County, Texas
Barbara Walther: First female elected as a Judge of the 51st District Court in Tom Green County, Texas (1992)

Travis County 

Anna Sandbo: First female lawyer in Austin, Texas [Travis County, Texas]
Gloria K. Bradford: First African American female to graduate from the University of Texas School of Law (1954) 
Mary Pearl Williams: First female judge in Travis County, Texas (1973)
Leslie Taylor: First female Justice of the Peace in Travis County, Texas (1977)
Margaret Moore: First female to serve as Travis County Attorney (1981)
 Sarah Eckhardt (1998): First female to serve as a County Judge in Travis County, Texas (2015)
Julie Kocurek: First female district court judge in Travis County, Texas (1999)
Rosemary Lehmberg: First female District Attorney for Travis County, Texas (2009)
Dimple Malhotra: First female of South Asian descent to serve as a judge in Travis County, Texas (2019)
Aurora Martinez Jones: First African American female to preside over the 126th District Court in Travis County, Texas (2022)
Denise Hernández: First openly lesbian Latino American female elected as a county court judge in Travis County, Texas (2022)

Upshur County 

 Lauren Parish: First female judge in Upshur County, Texas (c. 1994)

Upton County 

 Peggy Garner: First female judge in Upton County, Texas (1974)

Van Zandt County 

 Teresa Drum: First female to serve as a Judge of the 294th District Court in Van Zandt County, Texas

Webb County 

 Elma Salinas Ender: First Latino American female to serve as a Judge of the 341st Judicial District of Texas (1983) [Webb County, Texas]

Wichita County 

 Charlye O. Farris (1953): First female lawyer (and African American female) to practice law in Wichita County, Texas
Pat Norriss: First female to serve on the commissioner’s court in Wichita County, Texas

Willacy County 

 Migdalia Lopez: First female to serve as a District Court Judge in Cameron and Willacy Counties, Texas

Williamson County 

 Frances Fullerton (1932): First female lawyer in Williamson County, Texas

Winkler County 

 Mary Frances Clark: First female judge in Winkler County, Texas (1979)

Wise County 

 Mary Velma Davenport: First female county judge in Wise County, Texas (c. 1938)

Zapata County 

 Norma Villarreal Ramírez: First female county judge in Zapata County, Texas (1995)

See also  

 List of first women lawyers and judges in the United States
 Timeline of women lawyers in the United States
 Women in law

Other topics of interest 

 List of first minority male lawyers and judges in the United States
 List of first minority male lawyers and judges in Texas

References 

Lawyers, Texas, first
Texas, first
Women, Texas, first
Women, Texas, first
Women in Texas
Lists of people from Texas
Texas lawyers